Fort Santa Cruz de Alorna also known as Halarn fort or Alorna Fort is one of  the oldest forts in Goa. It is situated 30 kilometers from the town of Mapusa. It was constructed by the Bhonsles of Sawantwadi in the 17th century, to defend against the Maratha attacks. From there, one can get a good view of the surrounding river and land. 

The renovation work of the Alorna fort has been completed and is open for public. The renovation work has been carried out by the Archeological Survey of India. and is not open to public. shape|url=http://articles.timesofindia.indiatimes.com/2010-12-24/goa/28220562_1_fort-archives-and-archaeology-conservation|archive-url=https://archive.today/20131001031821/http://articles.timesofindia.indiatimes.com/2010-12-24/goa/28220562_1_fort-archives-and-archaeology-conservation|url-status=dead|archive-date=October 1, 2013|work=The Times of India|access-date=6 June 2013}}</ref>

References

Buildings and structures in North Goa district
Forts in Goa